Azor is a city in Israel. Azor may also refer to:

 Azor, small town in the Tel Aviv District of Israel
 Azor (landowner), an 11th-century landowner
 Azor (horse) (foaled 1814), a British Thoroughbred racehorse
 Azor (biblical figure) (died 372 BC), an ancestor of Jesus from the tribe of Judah.
 The trade name of the following pharmaceutical drugs:
 Olmesartan/amlodipine (in the US)
 Alprazolam (in South Africa)
 Azor (film), an Argentine–French–Swiss drama

See also
 Asor
 Azores
 Azur (disambiguation)
 Azure (disambiguation)
 Hazor (disambiguation)